The Fishermen and the City, also known as City Fisherman, is a South Korea variety show program on Channel A. Currently, the show consist of Lee Deok-hwa, Lee Kyung-kyu, Lee Soo-geun, Lee Tae-gon and Kim Jun-hyun.

The filming began on July 2017. Season 1 of the show was aired on Channel A starting September 7, 2017 and ended on September 9, 2019. It was distributed and syndicated by Channel A every Thursday at 23:00 (KST).

Season 2 of show started on December 19, 2019 and ended on February 4, 2021. It was aired on Channel A every Thursday at 21.00 (KST).

The end of Season 2 will make way for the planning of Season 3. Season 3 of show started on May 6, 2021 and ended on January 27, 2022. It was aired on Channel A every Thursday at 22.30 (KST).

On May 17, 2022, Channel A had announced the show will be renewing for a Season 4 that is slated to air in July 2022.

Synopsis
This is a fishing entertainment program featuring the 2 MCs of the show (Lee Deok-hwa and Lee Kyung-kyu). On every episode, they also give celebrities who enjoy fishing the opportunity to visit beautiful, secret fishing spots and having bonding time. While on the show, celebrities also share useful fishing tips with viewers.

Casts

Season 1
Lee Deok-hwa (Episode 1 - 107)
Lee Kyung-kyu (Episode 1 - 107)
Microdot (Episode 1 - 66)
Jang Do-yeon (Episode 76 - 107)

Season 2
Lee Deok-hwa
Lee Kyung-kyu
Ji Sang-ryeol
Lee Soo-geun
Lee Tae-gon
Kim Jun-hyun
Park Jin-chul
Park Byung-eun

Season 3
Lee Deok-hwa
Lee Kyung-kyu
Lee Soo-geun
Lee Tae-gon
Kim Jun-hyun

Episodes

Season 1

Season 2

Ratings
In the ratings below, the highest rating for the show will be in red, and the lowest rating for the show will be in blue each year.

Season 1

Season 2

Season 3

Footnotes

References

External links 
Season 1 Official website
Season 2 Official website
Season 3 Official website

2017 South Korean television series debuts
Channel A (TV channel) original programming
South Korean variety television shows
Korean-language television shows
Fishing television series
2020s South Korean television series
South Korean reality television series